William Holmes (1849 – 26 November 1885) was a New Zealand cricketer. He played in three first-class matches for Wellington from 1880 to 1884.

See also
 List of Wellington representative cricketers

References

External links
 

1849 births
1885 deaths
New Zealand cricketers
Wellington cricketers
Place of birth missing
Nelson cricketers